Sidi Lakhdar Mosque, or Djamâa Lakhdar is a mosque located in Constantine, Algeria.

Architecture 
It is mainly characterised by its curved marble columns and its admirable sculpted capitals.the sanctuary of the mosque, which has a rectangular shape, is located on the first floor and can be entered through two open doors in the wall opposite the mihrab  and its "minbar" of carved wood,it was classified in 1905  and its decoration remains a witness on the history of its construction through the roof and wooden columns.

History 
Sidi Lakhdar Mosque is located in the Al-Jazzarin neighborhood, and it was built in 1743 by the Bey Hussein bin Hussein, known as Bouhanak, who was buried in this mosque after his death. 
In 1913 The mosque, which witnessed many scholarly sessions of Sheikh Abdelhamid Ben Badis he installed his seminary and marked the center of his foundation "Algerian Muslim Congress" (CMA),

See also

Ahmed Bey Palace
Emir Abdelkader Mosque
El Bey Mosque
Great Mosque of Constantine
List of mosques in Algeria

References

Mosques completed in 1743
Mosques in Constantine, Algeria
Sunni mosques
Sunni Islam in Algeria
Landmarks in Algeria
Buildings and structures in Constantine Province
Ottoman Mosques in Algeria
1743 establishments in Algeria
1743 establishments in the Ottoman Empire
18th-century religious buildings and structures in Algeria